Sallins is a Gaelic Athletic Association (GAA) club in Sallins, County Kildare, Ireland, winner of Kildare club of the year in 2001.

Honours
 Kildare Intermediate Football Championship: (2) 1968, 2003
 Kildare Junior Football Championship: (2) 1967, 2001
 Leinster Junior Club Football Championship: (1) 2000
 Jack Higgins Cup Winners (1) 2001
 The Niall Smullen Cup (5) 1925, 1946, 1954, 1971, 1985
Conneff Cup winners 2002
 LGFA Junior C Championship winners 2021

History

In 2009 & 2010 Sallins Minors won the B championship

Hurling

Sallins also has a separate hurling club. While juvenile hurling is part of the main Sallins GAA club, their men’s team has been set up as a separate club due to a conflict of interest for some footballers. 

After a break of over 30 years, Sallins started juvenile hurling in 2002 and fielded an adult team in 2003 and has been competing ever since.

The current hurling side play in the Junior League and Championship. In 2009, the hurlers made both league and championship semi finals.

Ladies football
After many years playing as an amalgamated team with players from the nearby village of Carragh, Sallins had their first adult ladies football team in 2018. They have had several successes since then, winning a division 7 league title in 2018, and a junior c championship cup in 2021. In 2021 the ladies footballers fielded two minor teams.

Camogie
The club fields camogie teams up to U17 level as of 2021

Bibliography
 Kildare GAA: A Centenary History, by Eoghan Corry, CLG Chill Dara, 1984,  hb  pb
 Kildare GAA yearbook, 1972, 1974, 1978, 1979, 1980 and 2000- in sequence especially the Millennium yearbook of 2000
 Soaring Sliothars: Centenary of Kildare Camogie 1904–2004 by Joan O'Flynn Kildare County Camogie Board.

External links
Official site
Facebook page

Gaelic games clubs in County Kildare
Gaelic football clubs in County Kildare